Alexandrovka is a rural locality (a khutor) in Kusekeyevsky Selsoviet, Birsky District, Bashkortostan, Russia. The population was 4 as of 2010. There is 1 street.

Geography 
Alexandrovka is located 41 km west of Birsk (the district's administrative centre) by road. Novourtayevo is the nearest rural locality.

References 

Rural localities in Birsky District